Dipprasad Pun, CGC is a Nepalese sergeant of the Royal Gurkha Rifles who was decorated with the Conspicuous Gallantry Cross for an act of bravery during the War in Afghanistan on the night of 17 September 2010. Pun, then an acting sergeant, single-handedly defeated 12 to 30 Taliban insurgents who were attacking his patrol base near Babaji in Helmand province.

Conspicuous Gallantry Cross
Immediately prior to the engagement, Pun, who was with the 1st battalion Royal Gurkha Rifles, was on sentry duty at a checkpoint guarding his unit's compound. Taliban fighters were attempting to plant an IED near the compound gate under the cover of darkness, when they surrounded and attacked his post with AK-47s and RPGs.  Believing he was about to die, he decided to kill as many of the enemy as possible. Over the course of the engagement, Acting Sergeant Pun fired 250 rounds from his machine gun, 180 from his rifle, used 17 hand grenades and a Claymore mine, before beating the last fighter, after his machine gun jammed, by throwing the tripod of his machine gun.

Upon receiving the award, Pun said that he had no choice but to fight, as the Taliban had surrounded his checkpoint, and that he was alone. Pun prevented his post from being overrun, saving the lives of three of his comrades. His actions are cited as "the bravest seen in his battalion during two tours".

Citation

References

Year of birth uncertain
Living people
Nepalese emigrants to the United Kingdom
People from Myagdi District
Royal Gurkha Rifles soldiers
Recipients of the Conspicuous Gallantry Cross
British Army personnel of the War in Afghanistan (2001–2021)
Gurkhas
Year of birth missing (living people)